The 2023 Big Ten women's basketball tournament was held from March 1–5, 2023 at Target Center in Minneapolis. As the tournament winner, Iowa, received the conference's automatic bid to the 2023 NCAA Division I women's basketball tournament.

Seeds
All 14 Big Ten schools participated in the tournament. Teams were seeded by 2022–23 Big Ten Conference season record. The top 10 teams received a first-round bye and the top four teams received a double bye.

Schedule

Bracket
 All times are Eastern.

* denotes overtime period

All-Tournament team
 Caitlin Clark, Iowa – Most Outstanding Player
 Monika Czinano, Iowa
 Gabbie Marshall, Iowa
 Diamond Miller, Maryland
 Cotie McMahon, Ohio State
 Taylor Thierry, Ohio State

References

Big Ten women's basketball tournament
2022–23 Big Ten Conference women's basketball season
Big Ten
College basketball tournaments in Minnesota
Women's sports in Minnesota